Tuqtu (Quechua for "broody hen", also spelled Tucto) is a mountain in the Cordillera Central in the Andes of Peru which reaches a height of approximately . It is located in the Junín Region, Chupaca Province, Yanacancha District.

References 

Mountains of Peru
Mountains of Junín Region